The women's 4x400 metres relay at the 2015 IPC Athletics World Championships was held at the Suheim Bin Hamad Stadium in Doha from 22–31 October.

Medalists

See also
List of IPC world records in athletics

References

4x400 metres relay
2015 in women's athletics
4 × 400 metres relay at the World Para Athletics Championships